Simon Horontchik (13 June 1889 – September 1939) was a Polish Jewish novelist and short story writer writing in Yiddish. 

Horontchik was born into a poor Hasidic family in Wieluń. He worked as a labourer at a lacework factory in Kalisz from the age of 17 until the outbreak of the First World War, during which time he began composing poetry. He narrowly escaped the destruction of Kalisz in August 1914, fleeing to Lodz and then Sompolno. There he became a grocer and married.

His first publication was a short story in the Yiddish daily Lodzsher Togblat in 1916. He published poetry in numerous publications until 1921, when he published his first book, Feldblumen ('Flowers of the Field'; Warsaw, 1921), thereafter devoting himself primarily to prose writing.

He lived for several years in Vlatslavek, Paris, Berlin, and Warsaw. He fled toward Vilna upon the Nazi occupation of Warsaw in September 1939, but ran into German troops engaged in a pogrom in Kalushin. He committed suicide to avoid a violent death.

Partial bibliography

References

1889 births
1939 suicides
20th-century Polish poets
20th-century Polish novelists
Suicides by Jews during the Holocaust
Yiddish-language poets
People from Wieluń
Polish Jews who died in the Holocaust
Suicides by sharp instrument in Poland
Polish refugees
World War II refugees